Cape Stolbchaty is a geographic cape on the west shore of Kunashir Island, the southernmost of the Kuril Islands, in Sakhalin Oblast, Russia. It is famous for its columnar basalt formations, which are strikingly similar to the Giant's Causeway in County Antrim in Northern Ireland.

See also 
 Columnar basalts formation
 List of places with columnar jointed volcanics

References

External links 
 Photos of cape Stolbchatiy

Columnar basalts
Stolbchaty